Fakhr al-Din Ali, better known as Sâhib Ata or Sâhip Ata, was a Persian vizier who held a number of high offices at the court of the Sultanate of Rum from the 1250s until his death in 1288. He was the dominant personality in Anatolia after the death of the Mu'in al-Din Parwana in 1277. He established numerous charitable foundations in cities across the Sultanate of Rum.

Fakhr al-Din's sons, the Sahib Ataids, established a short-lived principality centered in Afyonkarahisar, which the neighboring Germiyanids absorbed ca. 1341.

Monuments

Fakhr al-Din left many architectural monuments. In 1271 he funded the construction of the Gök Medrese in Sivas.

References

1288 deaths
People from the Sultanate of Rum
History of Afyonkarahisar Province
Year of birth unknown
13th-century Iranian people